Luhya or Abaluyia may refer to:
 Luhya people
 Luhya language

Language and nationality disambiguation pages